General elections are due to be held in Oman in October 2023.

Electoral system
The 85 members of the Consultative Assembly are elected from 24 two-member constituencies and 37 single member constituencies.

References

Oman
2023 in Oman
Elections in Oman
Non-partisan elections